Sherzad is a district in the west of Nangarhar Province, Afghanistan. It has a short (approximately 5 km) stretch of border with Pakistan. Its population, which is 100% Pashtun, was estimated at 66,392 in 2002, of whom 26,500 were children under 12. The district center is the village of Sherzad.

A large portion of the population belongs to the Shirzad sub-tribe of the Khogyani Karlan Pashtun tribe.

References

External links
Map of Sherzad district (PDF)
UNHCR District Profile, dated 2002-05-14, accessed 2006-07-24 (PDF).

Districts of Nangarhar Province